Hosackia incana, synonym Lotus incanus, is a species of legume native to California. It is known by the common name woolly bird's-foot trefoil. It is endemic to the Sierra Nevada of California, where it grows in forests and other mountain habitat.

Description

References

External links
Jepson Manual Treatment - Lotus incanus
USDA Plants Profile
Lotus incanus - Photo gallery

incana
Endemic flora of California
Flora of the Sierra Nevada (United States)
Flora without expected TNC conservation status